Duguesclin was a  74-gun ship of the line of the French Navy.

Career 
Ordered on 24 April 1804, Duguesclin was one of the ships built in the various shipyards captured by the First French Empire in Holland and Italy in a crash programme to replenish the ranks of the French Navy.
Her breaking up was approved on 11 January 1820.

Notes, citations, and references

Notes

Citations

References

 

Ships of the line of the French Navy
Téméraire-class ships of the line
1807 ships